Jacques Torczyner (July 8, 1914–March 7, 2013) was a leader in the American and international Zionist movement. He was born in Antwerp, Belgium, in 1914 and emigrated to the United States in 1940, escaping Belgium after the Nazi invasion. He became a member of the Zionist Organization of America ("ZOA"). He joined 18 Jewish leaders at a special meeting in July 1945 called by David Ben-Gurion organizing the Friends of the Haganah to organize support for the Jewish defense forces in Palestine.

He was active in the campaign for the creation of the Jewish State led by Abba Hillel Silver and took on additional responsibility when Silver became the President of ZOA. After the founding of the State of Israel, he was a member of the Rifkind Committee and various Special Committees of the Jewish Agency charged with evaluating the future of the Zionist movement. Torczyner served five consecutive terms as president of the ZOA.

From 1974 to 1977 he was chairman of the American section of the World Jewish Congress. From 1972 till 1998 he was member of the Executive of the World Zionist Organization in charge of its Foreign Relations Department and the Herzl Institute, the adult education Institute of the World Zionist Movement.

He was also appointed a member of the American UNESCO Committee, and served on the Holderman Committee, which recommended that the United States should leave UNESCO. Later, he was appointed a special advisor to the Director General of UNESCO, Federico Mayor.

Torczyner widely lectured around the world and wrote articles on issues faced by the State of Israel and World Jewry. He was the nephew of Naftali Herz Tur-Sinai.

His papers are archived at the Menachem Begin Heritage Center in Jerusalem.

Torczyner died on March 7, 2013.

References

1914 births
2013 deaths
Jews who emigrated to escape Nazism
American Zionists
Belgian emigrants to the United States
Belgian Jews
Politicians from Antwerp
Belgian Zionists